Count Thierry de Limburg Stirum (11 April 1827 – 6 March 1911) was a Belgian historian, bibliophile, and politician who served as a Senator from 1878 to 1900.

Early life
Count Thierry Marie Joseph de Limburg Stirum was born in Antwerp on 11 April 1827. He was the son of Willem de Limburg Stirum (1795–1889) and Albertine de Pret de Calesberg (1800–1856). His father, who was of Dutch and Gelders origin, served in the French imperial army and later in the Dutch army after 1815. Following the creation of Belgium, Thierry received Belgian citizenship in 1841.

Career

Thierry de Limburg Stirum was Doctor in Law (KU Leuven) and Belgian senator for the department of Ostend-Veurne-Diksmuide from 1878 to 1900.

He was president of the Conseil Heraldique and president of the Royal Commission for Ancient Laws and Ordinances.

A famous bibliophile, he became a member of the Society for History of Bruges in 1870, known under the name 'Société d'Emulation'. From 1891 until his death he was president of that Society.

Personal life
In 1856, he married Countess Marie-Thérèse de Thiennes Leyenburg et de Rumbeke (1828–1909), a daughter of Count François de Thiennes, Chamberlain of King Guillaume of the Netherlands and Baroness Asterie de Draeck. Before her death in Brussels in 1909, they were the parents of four children who had numerous descendants, including:

 Henri de Limburg Stirum (1864–1953), mayor of Rumbeke.
 Everard de Limburg Stirum (1868–1938), mayor of Huldenberg.

Count de Limburg-Stirum died in Brussels on 6 March 1911.

Publications

 Description des sceaux de quelques seigneurs de Flandres, Brugge, 1869
 La Cour des Comtes de Flandre, leurs officiers héréditaires, Ghent, 1878.
 Codex Diplomaticus Flandriae, 1296-1327, Brugge, 1879-1889.
 Flandriae inde ab anno 1926 ad usque 1325 (...), Brugge, 1879.
 Le Cartulaire de Louis de Male, comte de Flandre, Brugge, 1893–1901

Ancestry

References

Members of the Senate (Belgium)
19th-century Belgian historians
Thierry de Limburg Stirum
Dutch nobility
1827 births
1911 deaths